The Education and Training Evaluation Commission (ETEC), formerly known as the Education Evaluation Authority, is a government organization responsible for planning, evaluation, assessment, and accreditation of educational and training systems in Saudi Arabia in coordination with the Ministry of Education.

Established in 2017 following the council of ministers’ decree No. 120, as a governmental entity, ETEC is independent both legally and financially and reports directly to the prime minister. The organization of the commission in its new entity was issued in 2019, in accordance with the council of ministers resolution No. 108 to strengthen its mission as a specialized authority to evaluate, measure, and accredit qualifications in the field of education and training for public and private sectors, as well as to raise their quality, efficiency, and their contribution to the service of the economy and national development in coherence with the kingdom's Vision-2030.

Key Tasks

Setting national standards for the evaluation of education, training, and general education curricula.
Elevating the measurement services, and assessments in the education and training system.
Implementing evaluation, program, and institutional accreditation in the education and training system.
Licensing professionals and workers in the education and training field.
Registering qualifications and awarding bodies.
Evaluating the performance of the education and training institutions and its qualification programs.
Employing evaluation results in raising the quality of education and training as well as their contribution; to service the kingdom's national economy and development.
Composing, measuring, and developing indicators, as well as sharing consultancy, knowledge, research and supporting innovation.
Develop, approve and implement systems for evaluation and accreditation, including evaluation and accreditation of institutions and programs, in the field of education and training. Such systems shall include necessary rules, standards, frameworks, indicators, and conditions.
Evaluate certificate programs implemented by educational and training institutions, and approve them periodically in accordance with criteria approved by the Council.
Build, implement and develop assessment tools and methods in education and training.
Build, approve and periodically update standards for general education curricula, in coordination with the Ministry of Educati                                                                  
Build and implement educational measures and tests (such as university admission tests, and national tests in general education stages which relate to evaluation of general education ) as well as training, vocational, professional, linguistic, cognitive and other tests and measures.
Build and implement diagnostic survey manuals as well as other manuals in the fields of education and training
Build and implement diagnostic survey manuals as well as other manuals in the fields of education and training.
 Participate in standard international tests designed for the evaluation of education and training, in accordance with regulations approved by the Council, and oversee the implementation of such tests in the Kingdom.
 Prepare professional standards for the practice of professions in general education and training, approve such standards and evaluate their implementation.
 Council, and oversee the implementation of such tests in the Kingdom.
 Prepare professional standards for the practice of professions in general education and training, approve such standards and evaluate their implementation.
 Build and implement tests related to professional competence of teachers and the like in education, as well as of trainers and the like in training, and issue their professional licenses in accordance with regulations approved by the Council.
 Develop a national framework for qualifications, which includes rules, controls, standards, indicators, conditions and procedures related thereto, and submit the same to the Council for approval and oversee the implementation thereof.
 Develop standards and conditions for education and training institutions seeking institutional and program accreditation from international accreditation bodies, determine requirements for exemption from program accreditation, submit the same to the Council for approval, and monitor their implementation.
 Set indicators related to ETEC’s work, check them periodically, develop them in light of international indicators.
 Establish centers affiliated with ETEC to carry out some of its powers; the Council shall determine their organizational affiliation, financial status, means for implementation of its powers, and manner for executing tasks assigned to it by ETEC.
 Establish or participate in establishment of companies or join companies as partners or shareholders, in accordance with applicable statutory procedures.
 Seek the assistance of persons, as it deems  necessary, to carry out its evaluation, assessment and accreditation activities, in whole or in part, or any complementary part thereto, in accordance with rules approved by the Council;
 License other entities, as it deems fit, to engage in evaluation, measurement, accreditation and qualifications in education and training in the Kingdom, in accordance with rules approved by the Council.
 License foreign entities to, directly or indirectly, engage in evaluation, accreditation, measurement, or qualifications in education or training inside the Kingdom, in accordance with rules approved by the Council.
 Carry out evaluation, measurement and accreditation activities outside the Kingdom, according to rules approved by the Council.
 Provide consultations and services to governmental, private and other bodies, inside and outside the Kingdom.
 Organize programs and courses within the scope of its powers.
 Organize and participate in seminars, conferences, workshops, exhibitions, competitions and prizes, in accordance with applicable statutory procedures.
 Issue magazines, periodicals, books, guides, and brochures related to ETEC’s tasks and activities.
 Exchange scientific and cognitive publications with educational and training institutions inside and outside the Kingdom, as well as with other relevant entities outside the Kingdom.
 Exchange experiences and expertise with similar entities outside the Kingdom, and establish channels for cooperation with them, in accordance with applicable statutory procedures.
 Monitor the implementation of the Kingdom's international obligations regarding evaluation, measurement and accreditation in education and training.
 Represent the Kingdom or participate in its representation before relevant regional and international committees, organizations and bodies, in accordance with applicable statutory procedures.

Vision and values

Vision Statement
“To be a pro-active catalyst in raising the quality and efficiency of education and training throughout the Kingdom of Saudi Arabia to the highest international standards”.

Values
Center business: Impact is to drive Innovation Efficiency. Partner commitment: Collaboration Integrity Transparency

References

External links
 Education Evaluation Commission
 Saudi Government Agency Directory

Education in Saudi Arabia
Government of Saudi Arabia
Government agencies of Saudi Arabia